Undersea Girl is a 1957 American crime film directed by John Peyser and written by Arthur V. Jones. The film stars Mara Corday, Pat Conway, Florence Marly, Dan Seymour, Ralph Clanton and Myron Healey. The film was released on September 22, 1957, by Allied Artists Pictures.

Plot

Cast          
Mara Corday as Valerie Hudson
Pat Conway as Lt. Brad Chase
Florence Marly as Leila Graham 
Dan Seymour as Lt. Mike Travis
Ralph Clanton as Sam Marvin
Myron Healey as Eric 'Swede' Nelson
Lewis Charles as Phil Barry 
Jerry Eskow as Dwyer
Dehl Berti as Joe
Sue George as Susie
Mickey Simpson as Frank Larkin
Mike Mason as Don Carson

References

External links
 

1957 films
American crime films
1957 crime films
Allied Artists films
Films directed by John Peyser
1950s English-language films
1950s American films